Bloomington is an unincorporated community in Macon County, Missouri, United States.

History
Bloomington was built in 1837, and is the oldest community in Macon County. It was originally called Box Ankle and served as Macon County's seat until 1863.

References

Unincorporated communities in Macon County, Missouri
Unincorporated communities in Missouri